"Another Minute" is a song by the American synthpop band Cause&Effect. It was released as a single in 1992.

Track listing

12" Maxi-Single
Catalog #:72445-14035-1

Side A
 Another Minute (Deep Sex Mix) (5:16)
 Another Minute (Ragga Dub) (5:24)
 Another Minute (Deep Sexstrumental) (5:14)

Side B
 Another Minute (Practice Faith Mix) (6:08)
 Another Minute (Effect Of Faith In Steve's Hands) (4:29)
 You Think You Know Her (Unfaithful Mix) (8:00)

CD Maxi-Single

Catalog #:72445-14044-2

 Another Minute (Radio Remix Edit) (3:42)
 Another Minute (Radio Edit) (3:35)
 Another Minute (Alternative Edit) (3:53)
 Another Minute (Deep Sex Mix) (5:16)
 Another Minute (Practice Faith Mix) (6:08)
 Another Minute (Ragga Dub) (5:24)
 Another Minute (The Drill Mix) (4:24)
 Unholy Day (bonus track) (5:01)

Cassette Promo Single
Catalog #:ZADV0036-4

 Another Minute (Alternative Radio)
 Unholy Day
 Another Minute (LP Version)
 Another Minute (Drill Mix)
 Another Minute (Deep Sex Mix)
 Another Minute (Practice Faith Mix)
 Another Minute (Ragga Dub)
 Another Minute (Radio Remix Edit)

12" Promo Maxi-Single
Catalog #:ZP17077-1

Side A
 Another Minute (Radio Remix Edit) (3:42)
 Another Minute (Radio Edit) (3:35)
 Another Minute (Alternative Radio Edit) (3:53)
 Another Minute (Deep Sex Mix) (5:16)

Side B
 Another Minute (Practice Faith Mix) (6:08)
 Another Minute (Ragga Dub) (5:24)
 Another Minute (The Drill Mix) (4:24)

12" Promo Maxi-Single
Catalog #:ZP17063-1
Side A
 Another Minute (The Drill Mix) (4:24)
Side B
 Another Minute (Another Effect Dub) (5:39)

CD Promo Maxi-Single
Catalog #:ZP17064-2
 Another Minute (Alternative Edit) (3:53)
 Unholy Day (5:01)
 Another Minute (Album Version) (3:35)
 Another Minute (4:24)
 You Think You Know Her (Unfaithful Mix) (8:00)

Chart positions

1992 singles
Cause and Effect (band) songs
American pop songs
1991 songs